Jennifer Collene Rubin is an American actress, former model and currently working as a writer/producer/director. A competitive swimmer during her youth, Rubin was discovered by the Ford Modeling Agency and went on to model for Calvin Klein and became Ford International Model of the Year in 1984. She made her film debut as Taryn White in the 1987 horror film A Nightmare on Elm Street 3: Dream Warriors and has since starred in a variety of films including Andrew Fleming's Bad Dreams (1988), Marisa Silver's Permanent Record (1988), Oliver Stone's  The Doors (1991), Alan Shapiro's The Crush (1993), Louis Venosta's The Coriolis Effect (1994), Christian Duguay's Screamers (1995), and the 2001 Dogme 95 inspired film Reunion. Outside of film, Rubin has guest starred on a variety of television series such as The Twilight Zone (1987) and Tales from the Crypt (1992). In 2010, Rubin appeared as herself in the documentary Never Sleep Again: The Elm Street Legacy and has since been also working as a writer, producer & director on her original screenplays.

Career
Rubin was born on 3 April 1962. She was raised in Phoenix, Arizona. After graduating from high school, she attended the University of Arizona, where she entered a modeling competition on the university's campus. Rubin dropped out of college and relocated to New York City to pursue modeling full-time. After beginning her modeling career, Rubin was named the Ford International Model of the Year in 1984. She was the original model for Calvin Klein Obsession ads and also modeled in Vogue.

Rubin's first acting role was as Taryn White in the 1987 fantasy horror film A Nightmare on Elm Street 3: Dream Warriors. The film earned over $44 million at the American box office. Rubin later guest starred on an episode of the television series The Twilight Zone as Amy Hawkline. In 1988, Rubin starred in the horror film Bad Dreams, the drama film Permanent Record, and the coming of age film Blueberry Hill. The following year, Rubin portrayed Claire in an episode of the television series Miami Vice. In 1990, Rubin starred in the comedy film Too Much Sun.

In 1991, she portrayed socialite Edie Sedgwick in Oliver Stone's biopic The Doors. In preparing for the role, Rubin met with Bob Dylan, who had had a relationship with Sedgwick. The same year, Rubin starred in the crime drama Delusion, and the television film Drop Dead Gorgeous.

In 1992, Rubin starred in the drama A Woman, Her Men, and Her Futon and the television film The Fear Inside. The same year, she guest starred on Tales from the Crypt. In 1993, Rubin portrayed Amy Maddik in the thriller The Crush opposite Alicia Silverstone and Cary Elwes, and she starred in Bitter Harvest and the television film Full Eclipse.

In 1994, Rubin was cast in the films Saints and Sinners, Gospel According to Harry, Playmaker, Red Scorpion 2, and Stranger by Night. The same year, Rubin starred alongside Dana Ashbrook and Quentin Tarantino in the short film The Coriolis Effect. In 1995, Rubin starred in the horror film Screamers and the drama film Deceptions II: Edge of Deception.

Rubin has produced - and starred in - the film, Road Kill (1999), and appeared in popular TV series including The Twilight Zone (1985) and Tales from the Crypt (1992). Rubin starred as the main character Janice Starlin in The Wasp Woman (1995). In 1997, Rubin starred in the films Twists of Terror and Plump Fiction and guest starred on an episode of The Outer Limits. In 1999, Rubin portrayed Tina in the film Deal of a Lifetime.

In the 2000s, Rubin was cast in roles of Sara in Bel Air, Sharon Williams in Falcon Down, Dorothy Smith in Sanctimony, and Carla Nash in Fatal Conflict. In 2001, Rubin portrayed Dr. Valdes in Cruel Game, Jeanie in Reunion, and Ione in Amazons and Gladiators. The same year, she starred in the television film Lawless: Beyond Justice. In 2006, Rubin starred in the television film Dreamweaver. In 2009, Rubin starred in the film Transmorphers: Fall of Man. The following year, Rubin appeared in the documentary Never Sleep Again: The Elm Street Legacy.

In 2013, Rubin starred in the television film Heebie Jeebies and was cast as Dr. Paula Bellman in the 2014 film Untold.

In other media 
Rubin was in Chris Isaak's music video for "Somebody's Crying" (1995) and Bruce Hornsby's music video for "Harbor Lights" (1993).

Personal life 
Rubin married actor Elias Koteas in 1987 and divorced in 1990; they had no children.

Filmography

Film

Television

References

External links

American female models
American film actresses
American television actresses
Living people
Actresses from Phoenix, Arizona
20th-century American actresses
21st-century American actresses
University of Arizona alumni
1962 births